The McKenzie Break is a 1970 British war drama film starring Brian Keith as Jack Connor, an intelligence officer investigating recent disturbances at a prisoner of war (POW) camp in Scotland. The Nazi German POWs are led by the charismatic and ruthless Willi Schlüter (Helmut Griem). Filmed in DeLuxe Color, the picture was directed by Lamont Johnson,

Plot
At the McKenzie prisoner of War (POW) camp in the north of Scotland, Kapitän zur See Willi Schlüter (Helmut Griem) – a Kriegsmarine U-boat commander – challenges the authority of the camp’s rigidly by-the-book commanding officer, Major Perry (Ian Hendry). British Army Intelligence Officer Captain Jack Connor, an Irishman seconded from the Royal Ulster Rifles. a former star crime reporter during peacetime, is in hot water (again) for various off-duty indiscretions.  His patron, General Kerr (Jack Watson), bails him out - in return for sending him to Camp McKenzie to learn what else might be behind the escalating uprisings beyond Perry's niggling authoritarianism.

Even though Perry remains titularly in charge, Connor takes over effective control of the camp. Factions between the U-boaters and members of the Luftwaffe emerge, with the maniacal Schlüter accusing the airmen of disloyalty to their Fatherland; the fliers in turn suspect Schlüter's motives and question both his tactics and the point of escape.  In their very first meeting Connor congenially taunts Schlüter over the escape tunnel the Irishman is sure is nearing completion.  Aware of the threat this presents, Schlüter orders maximum effort to speed the work ahead of schedule.

During a mass brawl Connor notices a group of POWs savagingly attacking one of their own, who barely escapes alive; in the ensuing chaos two Germans dressed as British soldiers escape to lay the groundwork for a mass escape of U-boat officers.  In his delerium the unconscious Neuchl (Horst Janson) keeps repeating the phrase "twenty-eight submarines". He is put into isolation, but before he can be questioned injured prisoners in the hospital ward stage a phony riot as cover for strangling Neuchl, faked as suicide.

Connor uses this sole snippet of random information from Neuchl to try to bamboozle Schlüter into believing he disclosed much more.  Even though Schlüter suspects Connor's ruse, he can't take any chances, and puts the escape plan into motion.

Unknown to Schlüter, Connor has brought in a cryptographer who has broken the code used in letters sent by POWs to Germany and is aware of the basics of the plan.

Taking advantage of a prolonged heavy rain - which is saturating an attic full of soil from the tunnel excavation hidden there - Schlüter triggers a cave-in atop a barracks full of Luftwaffe prisoners in order to divert attention during the escape.  Unaware of his murders, the U-boaters breach the camp and successfully rendezvous with their transport to the beach where they are to be rescued by submarine.

In spite of having ordered special patrols to track the POWs, the German party eludes Connor's men and he is forced to alert local police and the Royal Navy for help in tracking Schlüter's dash to the sea.  Aerial reconnaissance is briefly successful, but the Germans execute diversions to shake it and reach their destination undetected.

Aware everything is slipping away, Connor commandeers an aircraft and pilot to search on his own.  Thanks to the sole miscue the Germans make he is able to spot their party and rescue sub, and alerts a nearby motor torpedo boat (MTB) that has been searching for the vessel, which makes full speed to intercept or sink it.

Schlüter's men paddle rubber rafts as fast as they can toward the surfaced sub, while Connor buzzes at wave-top height to slow them.  Three of the rafts reach the sub, just as the MTB heaves into sight.  The sub immediately dives, leaving Schlüter and his raft-mates behind.  The MTB fires a pattern of depth charges, which the sub appears to elude.  Schlüter glares at Connor overhead, who observes aloud that both are "in the shithouse now".

Cast
 Brian Keith as Captain Jack Connor
 Helmut Griem as Kapitän zur See Willi Schlüter
 Ian Hendry as Major Perry (Camp CO)
 Jack Watson as Major General Ben Kerr
 Patrick O'Connell as Sergeant Major Cox
 Horst Janson as Lieutenant Neuchl
 Alexander Allerson as Lieutenant Wolff
 John Abineri as Captain Kranz
 Constantine Gregory as Lieutenant Hall
 Tom Kempinski as Lieutenant Schmidt
 Eric Allan as Lieutenant Hochbauer
 Caroline Mortimer as A.T.S. Sergeant Bell
 Mary Larkin as Corporal Jean Watt
 Gregg Palmer as Lieutenant Berger
 Michael Sheard as Ingenieur-Offizier Unger
 Ingo Mogendorf as Lt Fullgrabe

Background
Kretschmer was also the subject of Operation Kiebitz, an attempt to liberate several U-boat commanders from Bowmanville by submarine, which was foiled by the Royal Canadian Navy.

Production
The film was based on the novel The Bowmanville Break by Sidney Shelley. Film rights were bought in January 1968, prior to the novel's publication, by the producing team of Jules Gardner, Arthur Levy and Arnold Laven, who ran LGL Productions and had a deal with United Artists. William Norton, who had done several scripts for LGL, was assigned to write the screenplay. The location of the story was shifted from Canada to Scotland.

In October 1968 Brian Keith signed to play the lead role. That month the novel was published. The New York Times called it "a crackling tale". "In the best tradition of escape literature," said the Chicago Tribune.

In February 1969 Andre De Toth was signed to direct. By April he had left the project and been replaced by Lamont Johnson. The film had been retitled The MacKenzie Break.

The film was shot in Ireland, at Ardmore studios Co. Wicklow, and in Bonmahon Co. Waterford, in October 1969.

References

External links
 
 
 
 

1970 films
1970 war films
British war films
1970s German-language films
World War II prisoner of war films
United Artists films
Films directed by Lamont Johnson
Films set in Scotland
1970s English-language films
1970s British films